Nicholas Burns may refer to:

 R. Nicholas Burns (born 1956), US Ambassador to China
 Nicholas Burns (actor) (born 1977), British actor
 Nick Burns, a character in the Saturday Night Live sketch, "Nick Burns, Your Company's Computer Guy"
 Nick Burns, a human in the animated series Challenge of the GoBots

See also
Nicholas Burne, Scottish Catholic controversialist
Nicholas Byrne (disambiguation)